Jack Henderson Clement (April 5, 1931 – August 8, 2013) was an American singer, songwriter, and record and film producer.

Biography

Early life
Raised and educated in Memphis, Tennessee, United States, Clement was performing at an early age, playing guitar and dobro. Before embarking on a career in music, he served in the United States Marines. In 1953, he made his first record for Sheraton Records in Boston, Massachusetts, but he did not immediately pursue a full-time career in music, instead choosing to study at Memphis State University from 1953 to 1955. Nicknamed "Cowboy" Jack Clement, during his student days, he played steel guitar with a local band. In 1956, Clement was part of one of the seminal events in rock-and-roll history, when he was hired as a producer and engineer for Sam Phillips at Sun Records. Subsequently, Clement worked with future stars such as Roy Orbison, Carl Perkins and Johnny Cash. Most notably, he discovered and recorded Jerry Lee Lewis while Phillips was away on a trip to Florida. One of those recordings, "Whole Lotta Shakin' Goin' On", was selected in 2005 for permanent preservation in the National Recording Registry at the Library of Congress.

Career
In 1957, Clement wrote the song "Ballad of a Teenage Queen", which became a crossover hit for Johnny Cash. Other Cash hits written by Clement include "Guess Things Happen That Way", which was No. 1 on the country chart and No. 11 on the pop chart in 1958, and the comedic "The One on the Right Is on the Left", which was a No. 2 country and No. 46 pop hit in 1966. Clement also produced (and came up with the horn intro) Cash's No. 1 hit, "Ring of Fire," in 1963. Clement performed "Guess Things Happen That Way" on the Johnny Cash Memorial Tribute on CMT (Country Music Television) in November 2003.

In 1958, Clement released the single "Ten Years", which was covered by Johnny Western (1959), Rex Allen (1962) and Roger Mews.

In 1959, Clement accepted an offer to work as a producer at RCA Victor in Nashville, then the most important label in the record industry. In 1961, he moved to Beaumont, Texas, joining the producer and publisher Bill Hall in opening the Gulf Coast Recording Studio and the Hall-Clement publishing company. He returned to Nashville permanently in 1965, becoming a significant figure in the country music business, establishing a publishing business, and founding a recording studio, making records for stars such as Charley Pride and Ray Stevens. In 1971, he co-founded JMI Records, which can be credited with launching the career of Don Williams. Bill Hall took control of Hall-Clement in 1973 and sold it to the Welk Music Group in 1975.

Clement wrote a number of successful songs that have been recorded by singing stars such as Johnny Cash, Dolly Parton, Ray Charles, Carl Perkins, Bobby Bare, Elvis Presley, Jim Reeves, Jerry Lee Lewis, Cliff Richard ("It'll Be Me"), Charley Pride, Tom Jones, Dickey Lee and Hank Snow. He was inducted into the Nashville Songwriters Hall of Fame in 1973. He also produced albums by Townes Van Zandt and Waylon Jennings.

Clement was involved in a few film projects as a singer or songwriter of soundtracks. He produced and part-financed the 1975 horror film, Dear Dead Delilah, a financial disaster and the last film performance by the actress Agnes Moorehead.

Later life
In 1987, Clement was approached by U2 to record at Sun Studio in Memphis. Clement was then oblivious to U2's catalog, but nonetheless agreed to arrange the session upon the urging of someone in his office. The result was a portion of the U2 album, Rattle and Hum, ("When Love Comes to Town", with B.B. King; "Angel of Harlem", a tribute to Billie Holiday; and "Love Rescue Me", with backing vocals by Bob Dylan), as well as the Woody Guthrie song "Jesus Christ", which was included on the 1988 album, Folkways: A Vision Shared — A Tribute to Woody Guthrie & Leadbelly. Portions of the two sessions also appear in the film Rattle and Hum.

In 2005, a documentary about Clement, Shakespeare Was a Big George Jones Fan, was created by Robert Gordon and Morgan Neville, pieced together from Clement's home videos and interviews with peers, including Jerry Lee Lewis and Bono.

Clement hosted a weekly program on Sirius XM Satellite Radio.

He was inducted into the Rockabilly Hall of Fame, the Memphis Music Hall of Fame, and the Music City Walk of Fame.

On June 25, 2011, a fire destroyed his home and studio on Belmont Boulevard in Nashville. Clement was unhurt, but many priceless recordings and memorabilia were lost.

On April 10, 2013, it was announced Clement would be inducted into the Country Music Hall of Fame.

Clement died at his home in Nashville, Tennessee, on August 8, 2013. He had suffered from liver cancer. He had two children, a daughter, Alison, also a singer and writer, and a son, Niles, an engineer and photographer.

References

External links

 Nashvillesongwritersfoundation.com
 Sirius.com
 3 part video interview with Jack Clement

1931 births
2013 deaths
Deaths from liver cancer
Film producers from Tennessee
American male singer-songwriters
Record producers from Tennessee
Country Music Hall of Fame inductees
Singer-songwriters from Tennessee
American country singer-songwriters
Musicians from Memphis, Tennessee
Sun Records artists
RCA Victor artists
Smash Records artists
Country musicians from Tennessee